Carr Communications is a public relations and training company in Ireland.

It was founded in 1973 by the Irish television presenter Bunny Carr.

Under Managing Director Terry Prone, the company expanded into public relations. The company has trained politicians to appear in media, including former Taoisigh, Bertie Ahern TD, Charles Haughey and Garret Fitzgerald as well as other prominent TDs from different political parties.

The company was subject to a management buyout in 2004 and the company's profits improved substantially. In 2008, Donal Cronin and Fergus Hoban became owners of the company following the departure of a number of senior executives. Terry Prone resigned as a director of the company in February 2008 and others left with her to set up a rival company.

In February 2008, Tony Hughes rejoined the company as managing director. In March 2008, it was reported that the company received substantial government contracts for its services.

References

External links
 Company website

Business services companies established in 1973
Service companies of Ireland
Public relations companies
Training companies
1973 establishments in Ireland